The discography of Reverend and The Makers, an English rock band, consists of five studio albums, one live album and one extended play.

The band was formed in 2005 after Jon McClure (flatmate to Alex Turner of the Arctic Monkeys) created the band after fronting two in the past, 1984 and Judan Suki. The band signed to Wall of Sound before releasing their debut album, The State of Things, which reached number 5 on the charts and sold 25,000 copies in its first week. The debut single off the album, "Heavyweight Champion of the World", reached the top ten, and the follow-up "He Said He Loved Me" also did well in the charts. The third and penultimate single from the album, "Open Your Window", was featured on FIFA 09, the popular football video game. The band toured, and soon after rumours began to surface that the band was close to splitting up.

However, the band's second album, A French Kiss in the Chaos, was released in 2009, and they were approached by Oasis to tour with them in what proved to be Oasis' final tour. McClure has appeared on Never Mind the Buzzcocks and Soccer AM in support of the album. The debut single, "Silence Is Talking", was received well by critics and fans, reaching number 14 on the UK Singles Chart, but the album received mixed reviews. In October 2009, the band recorded their live concert at the O2 Academy Sheffield and released it as a live album via the internet, titled Live in the UK.

The band released their third studio album, @Reverend Makers, on 18 June 2012, with the album reaching number 16 on the UK Albums Chart.

Albums

Studio albums

Live albums
 Reverend and the Makers: Live in the UK (2009)

Compilation albums

Extended plays
 Sundown on the Empire / 18-30 / The Machine – Remixes (2008)

Singles

References

Rock music group discographies